The Belgian Division 3, commonly referred to as simply Derde Afdeling (in Dutch) or Division 3 (in French) is the fifth-highest division in the Belgian football league system, one level below the Belgian Division 2. It was created by the Royal Belgian Football Association in 2016 as a new layer at the fifth level of the league system, at that time named Belgian Third Amateur Division. From the 2020–21 season on it was renamed to Belgian Division 3, due to the negative connotation of the word amateur. The division consists of four separate leagues with 16 teams each, two of these leagues consist of teams playing with a license from the Voetbalfederatie Vlaanderen (VFV, the Dutch-speaking wing of the RBFA) and two with teams with a license from the Association des Clubs Francophones de Football (ACFF, the French-speaking wing of the RBFA).

History
The Belgian Third Amateur Division was created in 2016 following an overhaul of the Belgian football league system which saw the number of professional clubs reduced to 24. As a result, from the third level and below only amateur clubs remain. The two remaining levels above the Belgian Provincial leagues were reformed into three amateur levels, namely the Belgian Second Amateur Division (reformed Belgian Third Division), the Belgian Third Amateur Division (reformed Belgian Fourth Division) and the newly created Belgian First Amateur Division. As a result, the Belgian Provincial leagues dropped to the sixth level of the league system. In 2020 the levels three to five were renamed to Belgian National Division 1, Belgian Division 2, and Belgian Division 3 respectively.

Competition format
In each of the four separate leagues, the season is a regular round-robin tournament with 16 teams. The winners of each league is promoted to the Belgian Division 2. The teams finishing in second place in each Flemish-speaking league and the three period winners (the season is divided into three periods) of these leagues will playoff for two extra promotion spots. No extra promotion places are available for the French-speaking leagues as there is only one French-speaking league at the Belgian Division 2, compared to two Flemish-speaking ones. Regarding relegation, the bottom three teams from each league are relegated to the Belgian Provincial leagues, but the number of teams to be relegated can increase depending on the number of teams being relegated directly from the Belgian Second Amateur Division.

Past winners

References

 
Sports leagues established in 2016
2016 establishments in Belgium
Fifth level football leagues in Europe
5